Hugh Morton "Wooly" Grey (July 4, 1896 – March 11, 1961) was an American college sports coach. He served as the head coach for Davidson College's football and men's basketball teams as well as the school's athletic director. Grey compiled overall records of 10–15–5 in football and 9–8 in basketball. Grey attended Davidson, in 1917 receiving All-Southern honors for his play on the football team from selectors John Heisman and Dick Jemison. He was also an alumnus of the University of Wisconsin. He also coached the Bailey Military Institute in South Carolina for the 1918-19 seasons.

Grey died while on vacation to visit a son in Venice, Florida in 1961.

Head coaching record

Football

Basketball

References

External links
 

1896 births
1961 deaths
Davidson Wildcats athletic directors
Davidson Wildcats football coaches
Davidson Wildcats football players
Davidson Wildcats men's basketball coaches
All-Southern college football players
University of Wisconsin–Madison alumni
People from Iredell County, North Carolina